The 12th Robert Awards ceremony was held in 1995 in Copenhagen, Denmark. Organized by the Danish Film Academy, the awards honoured the best in Danish and foreign film of 1994.

Honorees

Best Danish Film 
 Nattevagten – Ole Bornedal

Best Screenplay 
 Lars von Trier &  - Riget

Best Actor in a Leading Role 
 Ernst-Hugo Järegård – Riget

Best Actress in a Leading Role 
 Kirsten Rolffes – Riget

Best Actor in a Supporting Role 
 Kim Bodnia – Nattevagten

Best Actress in a Supporting Role 
 Rikke Louise Andersson – Nattevagten

Best Cinematography 
 Eric Kress – Riget

Production Design 
 Palle Arestrup –

Best Costume Design 
 Manon Rasmussen –

Best Makeup 
 Michael Sørensen – Nattevagten

Best Sound Design 
 Per Streit – Riget

Best Editing 
 Camilla Skousen – Nattevagten

Best Score 
  - Riget

Best Documentary Short 
 Drengen der gik baglæns – Thomas Vinterberg

Best Short Featurette 
 Fra hjertet til hånden – Tómas Gislason

Best Foreign Film 
 Remains of the Day – James Ivory

Special Jury Prize (Short) 
 Claus Loof (posthumously)

See also 

 1995 Bodil Awards

References

External links 
  

1994 film awards
1995 in Denmark
Robert Awards ceremonies
1990s in Copenhagen